Webb Glacier is a glacier just north of Mount Bastion and Gibson Spur, flowing south-east into the head of Barwick Valley in Victoria Land. It was named by the Victoria University's Antarctic Expeditions (VUWAE) (1958–59) for P.N. Webb who, with B.C. McKelvey, did the first geological exploration in this area (1957–58) and was in Wright Valley with VUWAE in 1958–59.

References
 

Glaciers of McMurdo Dry Valleys